Francis J. 'Bevi' Bevilacqua (born August 12, 1923, in Haverhill, Massachusetts – May 16, 2009 Lawrence, Massachusetts) was an American politician who represented the 3rd Essex district in the Massachusetts House of Representatives from 1959 to 1981. He served on several committees including Ways & Means, Rules (serving as Assistant Majority Leader), State Administration, Counties (he was chairperson from 1965 to 1967), and Cities and Towns. In 1964, he was a member of the Electoral College.

See also
 Massachusetts House of Representatives' 15th Essex district

References

External links

1923 births
2009 deaths
Democratic Party members of the Massachusetts House of Representatives
Politicians from Haverhill, Massachusetts
20th-century American politicians